Another Sky is an English progressive rock band formed in London with their debut show in 2017 by Catrin Vincent, Max Doohan, Naomi Le Dune, and Jack Gilbert while they were all studying music. Vincent's unique singing voice is often mentioned in reviews, including for their released their debut album, I Slept On the Floor, in 2020. They have followed that up with an EP, Music For Winter Vol. I, in 2021.

History
Began forming in 2014 while the founding members of the band (Catrin Vincent, Max Doohan, Naomi Le Dune, and Jack Gilbert) were studying music at Goldsmiths, University of London and formed a band as a part of their degree. The band members had a diverse selection of musical taste: heavy grunge, drum jams, James Taylor, and Tracy Chapman; so much so that frontwoman Catrin Vincent said "I think that's why the music often comes out confused". Their shared interest in a Talk Talk album, Laughing Stock, helped them get together as a band after they all "discovered [it] around the same time. We ended up getting in a room, jammed together and wrote a song straightaway".

In 2016, before naming their band, they wrote an unreleased song named "Another Sky" after Emily Dickinson's poem s:There is another sky and named their band after that song because it "made complete sense; when we make music together, we feel like we're somewhere different".  Early performances include supporting experimental artist, Ghostpoet, alongside singer-songwriter, Rosie Lowe and playing the BBC Introducing stage at Bestival.

Their first public performance was at London's St Pancras Old Church in 2017. For that performance and later ones, they performed in total darkness and then sometimes backlit with custom built lights, in attempt to remain anonymous. By early 2019, they had started performing more conventionally.

In 2019, their song "The Cracks" was included in the soundtrack of the video game FIFA 20.

In early 2021, they told Dork magazine that they are working on volume two for Music for Winter and a second full-length album. They had hinted it was possible it could have been released in 2021 (as of September 2022, neither have been released), but also did not want to commit to a timeline.

In March 2022, they announced on their Twitter account that they band agreed their second album was "finished and ready for mixing."

Reception

They performed for NPR's Tiny Desk Concerts in December 2019 (with the video released in February 2020) and Bob Boilen wrote for NPR that there was "intensity and clear intention to the music.... But in the confines of an office, hearing Catrin Vincent's unique voice, raw and un-amplified, brought it to another level."

For The Independent, Roisin O’Connor gave their debut album, I Slept On the Floor, 4 out of 5 stars and said that Vincent's voice is "somehow genderless, alien – it's simply impossible not to listen to her". It also praised the album exploring "weighty issues such as mental health and toxic masculinity" and mentions there are both "crawling guitar riffs, juddering rhythms and ominous percussion" and "quieter tracks" as well, summing up the review saying the album is a "marvellous, and intense, debut".

David Cheal in the Financial Times'''s review of I Slept On the Floor was more mixed with 3 out of 5 stars, saying the album has "perhaps a formulaic quality" but still ends with "Vincent’s voice stands out. We will be hearing more of it."

Members

Catrin Vincent – Vocals, Piano, Synth, Electric Guitar, Rhodes, Autoharp, Vocoder, Organ (2017–present)
Jack Gilbert – Electric Guitar, Acoustic Guitar, Classical Guitar, Synth, Ukulele, Backing Vocals, Percussion (2017–present)
Naomi Le Dune – Bass Guitar, Synth, Backing Vocals (2017–present)
Max Doohan – Drums, Percussion, Synth, Programming, Backing Vocals (2017–present)

Discography
Album
 I Slept On the Floor (2020)

EPs
 Forget Yourself (2018)
 Life Was Coming In Through The Blinds (2019)
 Music For Winter Vol. I'' (2021)

References

External links
 

British progressive rock groups
British post-rock groups
Musical groups established in 2017
Fiction Records artists